Apamea longula is a moth of the family Noctuidae first described by Augustus Radcliffe Grote in 1879. It is found in western North America, mostly from California to the Great Plains. There are also a few records from areas north, including Alberta, Yukon, and Alaska.

The forewing length is 17 to 22 millimetres.

References

Apamea (moth)
Moths of North America
Moths described in 1879
Taxa named by Augustus Radcliffe Grote